Ganjo may refer to:

 Ganjo Takkar, a limestone hill range in the Sindh province of Pakistan
 the Australian name for a Banjo guitar

See also
 Ganjō-ji, a Buddhist temple in Iwaki, Fukushima Prefecture, Japan